This is a list of crustaceans of Puerto Rico.

List
 Atya innoccus (Innocous freshwater shrimp, gata chica, chágara)
 Atya lanipes (Spinning freshwater shrimp, chágara giradora)
 Atya scabra (Roughback freshwater shrimp, guábara, gata grande)
 Macrobrachium carcinus (Bigclaw river shrimp, camarón de Años, viejo)
 Macrobrachium crenulatum (Striped river shrimp, coyuntero del verde, rayao)
 Macrobrachium faustinum (Bigarm river shrimp, coyuntero, pelú, popeye)
 Macrobrachium heterochirus (Cascade river shrimp, camarón tigre, leopardo)
 Emerita portoricensis (Puerto Rican sand crab, cangrejo topo)
 Typhlatya monae
 Cardisoma guanhumi (blue land crab, juey común)
 Gecarcinus lateralis (blackback land crab, red land crab, jueyita de tierra, mona)
 Gecarcinus ruricola (purple land crab, black land crab, juey morao)
 Arenaeus cribarius (Speckled swimming crab, cocolía marina, pecosa)
 Callinectes bocourti (Bocourt swimming crab, cocolía de Bocourt)
 Callinectes exasperatus (Rugose swimming crab, cocolía arrugada)
 Callinectes ornatos (Shelligs, cocolía adornada, jaiba)
 Callinectes sapidus (Blue crab, cocolía azul)
 Cardisoma guanhumi (Blue land crab, juey de tierra, juey azul, palanca)
 Carpilius corallinus (Batwing coral crab, juey dormido)
 Epilobocera sinuatifrons (Puerto Rican freshwater crab, buruquena, bruquena)
 Gecarcinus laterales (Blackback land crab, jueyita de tierra)
 Gecarcinus ruricola (Purple land crab, juey morao, monita)
 Goniopsis cruentata (Mangrove root crab, juey de mangle, cangrejo)
 Mithrax spinosissimus (Channel clinging crab, cangrejo rey del Caribe)
 Ocypode quadrata (White ghost crab, cangrejo fantasma, jueya blanca)
 Ucides cordatus (swamp ghost crab, zambuco, cambú, juey pelú)

See also

 Isla de Jueyes
 Maunabo Crustacean Festival

References

Further reading
 Aprende a comer cangrejo. Liz Sandra Santiago. Primera Hora. 24 March 2016. Accessed 24 March 2016.
 Tradición y sabor en Toa Baja. Amaya García Velasco. Sal! 15 March 2014. Accessed 24 March 2016.
 Indiscutible rey de los jueyeros. Bárbara J. Figueroa Rosa. 6 July 2013. Accessed 24 March 2016.
 Historia del Cangrejo de Mar y Rio and la Dieta Alimenticia. Carlos Azcoytia. Agosto 2008.  Accessed 24 March 2016.
 Guia Informativa para la Pesca Recreativa en Puerto Rico (aka, Reglamento de Pesca de Puerto Rico). Caribbeanfmc.com. Estado Libre Asociado de Puerto Rico. Departamento de Recursos Naturales y Ambientales. Negociado de Pesca y Vida Silvestre. 3rd Edition. 2011. Accessed 24 March 2016.
 Happy Carb se va de San Patricio. Marian Díaz. El Nuevo Dia. 24 March 2016. Accessed 24 March 2016.

External links
 Festival Jueyero de Maunabo P R. Poncho Hurtado. 4 July 2011. Accessed 24 March 2016.

Crustaceans
Fauna of the Caribbean
Crustaceans
Decapods
Puerto Rico